Ann Coleman may refer to:

 A. Catrina Coleman (born 1956), Scottish electrical engineer and professor
 Ann Mary Butler Crittenden Coleman (1813–1891), American author and translator